The 1893–94 Irish Cup was the fourteenth edition of the premier knock-out cup competition in Irish football. 

Distillery won the tournament for the fifth time, defeating reigning champions Linfield 3–2 in the final replay, after a 2–2 draw in the first match.

Results
Leinster Nomads, Bohemians, Dublin University and Montpelier were given byes into the third round, while Linfield, Cliftonville, Distillery, Glentoran, Ulster, Ligoniel, and Moyola Park were given byes into the fourth round.

First round

|}

Second round

|}

Third round

|}

Fourth round

|}

Fifth round

|}

1 A replay was ordered after a protest but Bohemians refused to play. St Columb's Court therefore progressed into the semi-finals.

Semi-finals

|}

Final

Replay

References

External links
 Northern Ireland Cup Finals. Rec.Sport.Soccer Statistics Foundation (RSSSF)

Irish Cup seasons
1893–94 domestic association football cups
1893–94 in Irish association football